Pristimantis leucopus is a species of frog in the family Strabomantidae.
It is found in Colombia and Ecuador.
Its natural habitat is tropical moist montane forest.
It is threatened by habitat loss.

References

leucopus
Amphibians of the Andes
Amphibians of Colombia
Amphibians of Ecuador
Amphibians described in 1976
Taxonomy articles created by Polbot